Dario Antonio Lodigiani [Lodi] (June 6, 1916 – February 10, 2008) was an infielder in Major League Baseball who played for two different teams between 1938 and 1946. Listed at 5'8", 150 lb., he batted and threw right-handed. He was born in San Francisco, California.  Lodigiani enjoyed a 17-year baseball career (1935–1954), playing parts of six seasons in the majors (1938–42, 1946) and 14 in the minor leagues (1935–40; 1947–54), losing three years while serving in the military (1943–45).

Early life
He played second base for Lowell High School (San Francisco), as his double play partner was shortstop Joe DiMaggio. In 1935, he graduated from Galileo High School (SF), where he was an All-Star in the baseball, basketball and football teams.

Professional career

At age 19, Lodigiani started his professional career with the Oakland Oaks of the Pacific Coast League (1935–37) and later joined the Williamsport Grays of the Eastern League (1938). He entered the majors in 1938 with the Philadelphia Athletics, playing for them until 1940 in one game before joining the Toronto Maple Leafs of the International League (1940). He returned to major league action with the Chicago White Sox (1941–42), and later served in the US Army Air Force during World War II (1943–45). After discharge, he rejoined the ChiSox in 1946, his last major league season.
 
In his rookie season with Philadelphia, Lodigiani posted a .280 batting average with six home runs and 44 RBI in 93 games. The next year he recorded career-highs in games (121), hits (102), runs (46), doubles (22), and matched his numbers in home runs and RBI while hitting .260.

In a six-season career, Lodigiani was a .260 hitter (355–for–1364) with 16 home runs and 156 RBI in 405 games, including 142 runs, 71 doubles, seven triples, 12 stolen bases, and a .338 on-base percentage. A disciplined hitter, he posted a solid 1.64 walk-to-strikeout ratio (141–to–86). On the field, he appeared in 275 games as a third baseman and 115 at second. He had an overall total of .948 fielding percentage (82 errors in 1582 chances).

Lodigiani returned to the Pacific Coast League with the Oakland Oaks (1947–49) and San Francisco Seals (1949–51). After that, he played and managed in the Western International League for Yakima (1952–53), and played with the Ventura Oilers (1953) and Channel Cities Oilers (1954) of the California League. Over 14 minor league seasons, he hit a .301 average with 74 home runs and 589 RBI. His best minor league season was with the 1937 Oaks, when he hit .327 with 35 doubles, 18 home runs and 84 RBI.

Later life
Following his playing career, Lodigiani scouted for the Chicago White Sox, discovering or signing players such as Dave Frost,   Rusty Kuntz, Jack McDowell, Rich Morales and Ken Williams. He also coached for the Cleveland Indians and Kansas City Athletics, and eventually gained induction to the Pacific Coast League Hall of Fame in 2006.

Death
Lodigiani died in Napa, California on February 10, 2008.

References

Further reading

External links

Retrosheet
Baseball in Wartime
Autographed to You 

1916 births
2008 deaths
American expatriate baseball players in Canada
Baseball players from San Francisco
Channel Cities Oilers players
Chicago White Sox players
Chicago White Sox scouts
Cleveland Indians scouts
Kansas City Athletics coaches
Major League Baseball second basemen
Major League Baseball third basemen
Minor league baseball managers
Oakland Oaks (baseball) players
Philadelphia Athletics players
San Francisco Seals (baseball) players
Toronto Maple Leafs (International League) players
United States Army Air Forces personnel of World War II
Ventura Oilers players
Williamsport Grays players
Yakima Bears players